Iman Essa Jasim (also spelled Jassim or Jassem, born 9 July 1997) is a Bahraini sprinter. She competed in the women's 100 metres event at the 2016 Summer Olympics. She was born Endurance Essien Udoh in Nigeria on 9 July 1997.

At the 2016 Asian Indoor Athletics Championships her team which included Salwa Eid Naser, Kemi Adekoya, and Aminat Yusuf Jamal set a new Asian and Championships Record of 3:35.07 in the Women's  relay event.

References

External links
 

1997 births
Living people
Place of birth missing (living people)
Bahraini female sprinters
Nigerian female sprinters
Olympic athletes of Bahrain
Athletes (track and field) at the 2016 Summer Olympics
Athletes (track and field) at the 2018 Asian Games
Nigerian emigrants to Bahrain
Asian Games gold medalists for Bahrain
Asian Games silver medalists for Bahrain
Asian Games medalists in athletics (track and field)
Medalists at the 2018 Asian Games
Islamic Solidarity Games competitors for Bahrain
Olympic female sprinters